Kingston is an unincorporated community in DeSoto Parish, Louisiana, United States. It is located approximately 16 miles south of Shreveport near the intersection of Louisiana highways 5 and 175.

The community is part of the Shreveport–Bossier City Metropolitan Statistical Area.

References 

Populated places in Ark-La-Tex
Unincorporated communities in DeSoto Parish, Louisiana
Unincorporated communities in Louisiana
Unincorporated communities in Shreveport – Bossier City metropolitan area